The women's 56 kg competition in judo at the 1992 Summer Olympics in Barcelona was held on 31 July at the Palau Blaugrana. The gold medal was won by Miriam Blasco of Spain.

Results

Main brackets

Pool A

Pool B

Repechages

Repechage A

Repechage B

Final

Final classification

References

External links
 

W56
Judo at the Summer Olympics Women's Lightweight
Olympics W56
Judo